The Bosniak Institute is an institution of culture and scholarship in Sarajevo, Bosnia and Herzegovina. It has a museum and a gallery, a cultural centre and a library, a publishing house and a cultural centre. The institute is the result of its founder, Adil Zulfikarpašić, a donor (waqf), businessman, politician and promotor of cultural and educational life in Bosnia and Herzegovina. With his wife Tatjana Zulfikarpašić, he collected and preserved cultural heritage and contemporary production about Bosnia and Herzegovina, ranging from documents, photographs, postcards, maps, to books, encyclopaedias, journals, and other archival and library materials. The Bosniak Institute was founded in Zurich in 1988, and after the aggression against Bosnia and Herzegovina the entire stock was moved to Sarajevo, and opened in 2001.

The Bosniak Institute includes a library, archive, art collection, galleries, reading rooms and researcher and scholar study rooms, conference rooms, and other amenities.

Gazi Husrev-bey's Hammam
The institute is situated in the centre of Sarajevo, at Mula Mustafe Bašeskije 21, adjacent to Gazi Husrev-begov hamam (Gazi Husrev-bey's Hammam), a public bath (hammam) built in 1535. Architects Hasan Ćemalović and Ahmet Kapidžić were awarded the Sixth of April Sarajevo Award in 2001 for the building, library, and a successful restoration of the Gazi Husrev-bey's Hammam. Two endowments (waqfs) are materialised in the Hammam building, first, Gazi Husrev-bey's, established when Islamic culture, education and scholarship were at their outset in Bosnia and Herzegovina, and the Bosniak Institute.

Library 
The library of the Bosniak Institute has over 250,000 items (books, journals, maps, articles and other materials) ranging from the 14th century to contemporary scholarly and trade-specific resources of the 21st century. The library includes the following sections: Bosnica, Croatica, Serbica, Turcica, Islamica, Yugoslavica, manuscripts, reference works, as well as the collections such as Judaica, Bogomils, Sanjak, Emigrantica, and the 1992-1995 war section.

Art collection 
The art collection of the Bosniak Institute evolved during several decades, originally as the private collection of Adil Zulfikarpašić and his wife Tatjana, and subsequently as the collection of the Bosniak Institute.

The collection includes more than 1500 artworks (paintings, engravings, and sculptures) by many Bosnian authors, from Ismet Mujezinović, Hakija Kulenović, Rizah Štetić, Ibrahim Ljubović, Vojo Dimitrijević, Mersad Berber, Affan Ramić, Mevludin Ekmečić, to Safet Zec, Salim Obralić, Mehmed Zaimović, and others. The donated private collections of Mersad Berber, Mevludin Ekmečić, Ismet Rizvić, Edo Numankadić and others are particularly significant.

Archive 
The archive includes more than 8000 items ranging from the 15th century to the modern age.

Mission 
The mission of the Bosniak Institute is to promote cultural heritage, historical truth and culture of Bosniaks and other peoples in Bosnia and Herzegovina. As part of its programs and activities, the institute develops and fosters scholarly cooperation with similar institutions in the country and abroad, collects, examines and preserves cultural and historical heritage and contemporary scholarly and trade-specific production of Bosnia and Herzegovina, organises scholarly, scientific, expert and international events, and develops its publishing production.

Management 
The Bosniak institute is managed by the steering committee and the managing director. The chair of the steering committee is Fehim Škaljić, deputy chair is Mirsad Kurtović, and the secretary is Erdal Trhulj. The director of the Bosniak Institute is Professor Faris Gavrankapetanović, Ph.D. Other members of the steering committee are: Professor Zlatko Lagumdžija, Ph.D., Mirsada Hukić, Ph.D., Hilmo Neimarlija, Ph.D., Safet Bandžović, Ph.D., Jasmina Bešlagić, Zijo Krvavac, and Taner Aličehić.

References

 Bošnjački institut - Fondacija Adila Zulfikarpašića. (2004) Bošnjački institut - Fondacija Adila Zulfikarpašića : Dolmabahce Saray Istanbul 28.11.04.-28.12.04.. Sarajevo : Bošnjački institut - Fondacija Adila Zulfikarpašića, 2004.
 Filandra, Š. i Karić, E. (2002) Bošnjačka ideja. Zagreb: Globus.
 Puljek-Bubrić, Narcisa (2005.). Promocija privatne bibliotečke zbirke : iskustva Bošnjačkog instituta-fondacija Adila Zulfikarpašića. ICSL - Godišnjak Međunarodnog susreta bibliotekara slavista u Sarajevu. ISSN 1840-1295. - God. 1, br. 1 (decembar/prosinac 2005), str. 166-169.
 Puljek-Bubrić, N., Kujović, M. i Gadžo Kasumović, A. (2020) Vodič kroz Arhiv Bošnjačkog instituta - Fondacije Adila Zulfikarpašića. Sarajevo : Bošnjački institut - Fondacija Adila Zulfikarpašića.
 Riznica bošnjačke kulture. Behar : časopis za kulturu i društvena pitanja, 19 (96). Zagreb : Kulturno društvo Muslimana Hrvatske Preporod, 2010.
 Rizvanbegović-Džuvić, Amina; Puljek-Bubrić, Narcisa (2007.). Slavističke kolekcije Bošnjačkog instituta : zbirke Emigrantika, Bogumili, Ratna zbirka i Orijentalni rukopisi = Slavic collections of Bosniak Institute : emigrantica, bogumils, war collection and oriental manuscripts. Bosniaca : časopis Nacionalne i univerzitetske biblioteke Bosne i Hercegovine. ISSN 1512-5033. - God. 12, br. 12 (decembar 2007), str. 68-72.
 Rizvanbegović-Džuvić, Amina; Puljek-Bubrić, Narcisa. (2007.). Promocija privatne bibliotečke zbirke : iskustva Bošnjačkog instituta-fondacija Adila Zulfikarpašića. ICSL - Godišnjak Međunarodnog susreta bibliotekara slavista u Sarajevu ... = ICSL - Yearbook of International Convention of Slavicist Librarian's in Sarajevo .. ISSN 1840-1295. - God. 3, br. 3 (decembar/prosinac 2007), str. 73-75.
 Zbirka likovnih djela Bošnjaka : 1988-2001 / Sarajevo : Bošnjački institut - Fondacija Adila Zulfikarpašića, 2001.
 Zulfikarpašić, A. (1998) The Bosniak : Adil Zulfikarpašić. London: London : Hurst & Company.

External links

  
 

Think tanks
Museums in Sarajevo
History museums in Bosnia and Herzegovina
Ottoman baths
Ottoman architecture in Bosnia and Herzegovina
2001 establishments in Bosnia and Herzegovina
Museums established in 2001
Bosniak culture
Culture in Sarajevo
I
Cultural promotion organizations
Bosnia and Herzegovina culture